Whartonia carpenteri is a species of  trombiculid mite collected from the eastern red bat, Lasiurus borealis, and the gray sac-winged bat, Balantiopteryx plicata.

Range 
Whartonia carpenteri has been recorded from the State of Morelos in central Mexico.

Taxonomy 
The species is classified in the subgenus Asolentria. The specific epithet honors "Lt. Cmdr. Malcolm Scott Carpenter, USA, who completed three orbits of the earth in the Aurora VII, 24 May 1962."

References 

Trombiculidae
Animals described in 1962
Arachnids of North America
Parasites of bats